Dragon Computer & Communication, widely known as Dragon in Indonesia, is the first and biggest hardware distribution company in Indonesia. Dragon is located on Jakarta, Java, Indonesia. Some of notable brand that is distributed under Dragon flag in Indonesia include, but not limited to, ACER, ASUS, Inktec, Elevo, Lite-ON and Edimax.

History

Batumas Computer Center (BCC)
Dragon, previously known as Batumas Computer Center (BCC), founded by Fransiskus Eddy Liew in 1980. Before establishing Dragon, Eddy Liew, whom at that time were Malaysian, were known as importer for several brands, such as Olivetti typing machine and Citizen Calculator, and Casio Digital Watch since 1973.

Eddy Liew is known by his colleague and relatives as an entrepreneur with visions as he sold his company in the golden era of calculator and digital watch and moved his business line to personal computer distribution and sales which is considered new and the prospect is still unclear.

The decision he made were fairly precise as BCC (where as at that time was selling first computer brand in Indonesia, Sinclair) was gaining a huge success, another brands that were distributed under BCC in the 80's including Commodore, IBM, KT Technology, Twinhead. BCC also known as ACER Software (before ACER is known for Computer Hardware & Peripheral Manufacture).

Transformation as Dragon Computer & Communication
Whilst Eddy Liew's second son was born in the year of dragon (1988), BCC change its name to Dragon Computer. As Eddy also foresee that computer hardware will not be separated with telecommunication hardware, he add "Communication" to "Dragon Computer" making it "Dragon Computer & Communication".

In 1998, Dragon's small shop in the area of Glodok, Jakarta. was also one of the target of the riot, the shop was burned down and looted. However, that even was becoming a turning point for the company to thrive and flourished even bigger as of now with HQ in "The Dragon" in Mangga Dua Square, Jakarta.

Dragon also one of the founder and idealist of Asosiasi Pengusaha Komputer Indonesia (APKOMINDO) and Asosiasi Informasi dan teknologi Indonesia (AITI)

Distributed brands
Dragon is known as Main Distributor of ACER and ASUS in Indonesia. Under Dragon flag, ACER become a #1 brand in Indonesia for 9 consecutive years 2005 - 2013 (According to IDC and GFK).

In 2014, ASUS appoint Dragon as one of its distributor and in the same year ASUS become #1 brand in Indonesia (According to IDC and GFK)

In the early era of Dragon, under Eddy Liew's leadership. Dragon also developed several well known brand to Indonesian market, such as: BENQ, Compaq, IBM Aptiva, Packard Bell, Gateway, E-Machine by Acer, Epson Printer, and Inktec.

Dragon also contribute to the success of Lite-ON brand and BTC (Taiwanese brand) in indonesia during 2003. Lite-ON become the leader brand of optical drive in indonesia market for 8 years (2003 - 2010).

Elevo
In 2008, Dragon's subsidiary company PT Elevo Technologies Indonesia formed a partnership with Maarash Technology China (Computer Distributor and Manufacturer of Compal brand) and created a notebook and netbook that was specifically created for Indonesian market, the brand itself then gain reputation as Indonesia own brand, with such an affordable price (under 1 mil Rupiah - Rp 999.000,00). On its early years, Elevo attract a lot of attention from Indonesian customers, however since the product was not officially backed by Indonesian government, Elevo were unable to compete well with well known global brands.

Dragon Capital Center
In early 2015, Dragon bootstrapped a startup company under the name PT Dragon Capital Center. Project which is still under stealth mode is set to be launched in 2016.

Dragon's Product Roadmap

Subsidiaries
 PT Dragon Capital Center (Internet Product and Service Company)
 PT Dharma Inti Teknologi (Computer Hardware Distributor)
 PT Dharma Citra Cendekia (Computer Hardware Distributor)
 PT Sinar Mitra Cendekia (Printer Ink and CCTV Distributor)
 PT Elevo Technologies (Computer Importer)

References

Companies based in Jakarta
Information technology companies of Indonesia
Companies established in 1980
Retail companies of Indonesia